Jakob Neser (30 December 1883 – 25 May 1965) was a German wrestler. He competed in the heavyweight event at the 1912 Summer Olympics.

References

External links
 

1883 births
1965 deaths
Olympic wrestlers of Germany
Wrestlers at the 1912 Summer Olympics
German male sport wrestlers
Sportspeople from Ludwigshafen
People from the Palatinate (region)